The San Diego Padres are a professional baseball franchise based in San Diego, California. They are a member of the National League (NL) West in Major League Baseball (MLB). The team joined MLB in 1969 as an expansion team and have won two NL Championships in 1984 and 1998. The team played their home games at Qualcomm Stadium (formerly known as San Diego Stadium and Jack Murphy Stadium) from 1969 to 2003. Starting with the 2004 season, they moved to PETCO Park, where they have played since. The team is owned by Ron Fowler, and A. J. Preller is their general manager. There have been 21 managers for the Padres franchise. The team was most recently managed by Jayce Tingler, who was fired at the end of the 2021 season.

The first manager of the Padres was Preston Gómez, who managed for four seasons. Bruce Bochy is the franchise's all-time leader for the most regular-season games managed (1926), the most regular-season game wins (951), the most playoff games managed (24), and the most playoff-game wins (8). Bob Skinner is the Padres' all-time leader for the highest regular-season winning percentage, as he has only managed one game, which he won. Of the managers who have managed a minimum of 162 games (one season), Jack McKeon has the highest regular-season winning percentage with .541, having managed for 357 games. Dick Williams, the only Padres manager to have been elected into the Baseball Hall of Fame, is the franchise's all-time leader for the highest playoff winning percentage with .400. Williams and Bochy are the only managers to have won an NL Championship with the Padres, in 1984 and 1998 respectively. Bochy and Black are the only managers to have won a Manager of the Year Award with the Padres, in 1996 and 2010. Greg Riddoch and Jerry Coleman have spent their entire managing careers with the Padres.

Key

Managers

Note: Statistics are correct as through November 1, 2021.

Notes 
 A running total of the number of managers of the Padres. Thus, any manager who has two or more separate terms as a manager is only counted once.
 Each year is linked to an article about that particular MLB season.

References 
General
 
 
 
 

Specific

Lists of Major League Baseball managers
Managers